How to Be a Serial Killer is a 2008 American black comedy crime horror film about a young serial killer who imparts his knowledge to an eager pupil. Written and directed by Luke Ricci, the film stars Dameon Clarke, Matthew Gray Gubler, Laura Regan, and George Wyner.

Plot
Mike Wilson (Dameon Clarke) is a charismatic, educated, and articulate young man who has found his life's purpose in exterminating people. Determined to spread his message about the joy of serial murder, Mike recruits a lost soul named Bart (Matthew Gray Gubler) to be his pupil and leads his charge through the "ethics" of murder as well as teaching him various lessons in disposing of corpses, balancing work and play, methods of killing, and many more. Mike and Bart's curriculum is interrupted when Mike's girlfriend Abigail discovers what's beneath her boyfriend's charming exterior and Mike and Bart must kill their way out of being discovered by the cops.

Cast

See also
 Man Bites Dog

References

External links
 
 
 

2008 films
2008 horror films
2000s comedy horror films
American independent films
American black comedy films
American comedy horror films
Films shot in California
Films shot in Los Angeles
American mockumentary films
American serial killer films
2008 comedy films
2000s English-language films
2000s American films